Mary Ward Brown (June 18, 1917 – May 14, 2013) was an American short story writer and memoirist. Her works largely feature Alabama as a setting and have received several awards.

Early life
Brown was born on June 18, 1917 in Hamburg, Alabama. She graduated from Judson College.

Career
Her first collection of short stories, Tongues of Flame, published in 1986, won the PEN/Hemingway (1987), the Alabama Author Award (1987),  the Lillian Smith Book Award (1991), and the Hillsdale Fiction Prize (2003). Following her second collection of short stories, It Wasn't All Dancing, published in 2002, Brown was awarded the Alabama Library Author Award (2003), the Hillsdale Award for Fiction (2003), and the Harper Lee Award (2002). 

Author Paul Theroux has said of her writing that it was "...direct, unaffected, unsentimental, and powerful for its simplicity  and for its revealing the inner life of rural Alabama...". Her story "Cure" was included in The Best American Short Stories 1984 (edited by John Updike & Shannon Ravenel). Southern journalist John S. Sledge called Brown "our genius, our Chekov".

Books
 Tongues of Flame (1986) New York: E.P. Dutton. .
 It wasn't all dancing, and other stories (2002) Tuscaloosa: University of Alabama Press. .
 Fanning the spark: a memoir (2009) Tuscaloosa: University of Alabama Press. .

Death
Brown died of pancreatic cancer in Marion, Alabama on May 14, 2013.

References

1917 births
2013 deaths
People from Perry County, Alabama
Novelists from Alabama
Judson College (Alabama) alumni
20th-century American novelists
American short story writers
American women memoirists